UNIT (UNified Intelligence Taskforce, formerly United Nations Intelligence Taskforce) is a fictional military organisation from the British science fiction television series Doctor Who. Operating under the auspices of the United Nations, its purpose is to investigate and combat paranormal and extraterrestrial threats to the Earth.

As is common in long-running series whose backstories are not mapped out in advance, and are also the product of many different writers over the course of years, the fictional history of UNIT have seen retroactive changes which have caused some continuity problems

Pre-UNIT
Following the canon of the television show only, the roots of the organisation in the history of the Doctor Who universe lie in one extraterrestrial incursion. As seen in the Second Doctor serial The Web of Fear (1968), there was an attempt to take over London by a disembodied entity known as the Great Intelligence, using robotic Yetis and a deadly cobweb-like fungus. A small group of British infantrymen, ultimately led by Colonel Alistair Gordon Lethbridge-Stewart of the Scots Guards (assisted by the Doctor), beat back the attempted conquest in the tunnels of the London Underground.

According to several sources outside of the television programme itself, UNIT also owes part of its existence to a much later television episode, the Seventh Doctor serial Remembrance of the Daleks (1988).  In that incident, two Dalek factions fought a battle in London over the Time Lord artefact known as the Hand of Omega in late 1963. They were defeated by detachment of soldiers from the 'Intrusion Counter-Measures Group', commanded by Group Captain "Chunky" Gilmore, along with help from the mysterious time traveller known as the Doctor. Gilmore also had the assistance of a Scientific Advisor, Dr. Rachel Jensen. According to non-canon sources, the ICMG was a special anti-terrorist group which drew its forces from the regular Army, and also the RAF Regiment. The Dalek incident was of course covered up. The ICMG was disbanded shortly afterwards; however, several of its training materials and procedures were adopted by UNIT. Gilmore later served as an advisor, often lecturing for UNIT personnel.

Following the Yeti Incident, the United Nations became aware that the world faced threats from extraterrestrial sources, and that with the space programme sending probes deeper and deeper into space, mankind had drawn attention to itself. Consequently, the United Nations established UNIT with the mandate to investigate, monitor and combat such threats. The United Nations was also given jurisdiction over first contact situations in 1968, as revealed in "The Sound of Drums". Lethbridge-Stewart was promoted to the rank of Brigadier and put in charge of the British contingent of UNIT, which was apparently under the purview of the British government's Department C19. Department C19 was mentioned in the serial Time-Flight, being the department at whose behest the Fifth Doctor investigated the mystery of a Concorde aeroplane that had disappeared. Several of the spin-off novels explore the idea that C19 gathers up alien technology for their own ends, as revealed in The Scales of Injustice and Who Killed Kennedy. The canonicity of the novels in relation to the series is unclear.

Twentieth century
Four years after the incident in the London Underground, the newly formed UNIT's baptism of fire was an invasion by the Cybermen, in The Invasion (1968). UNIT repulsed this, once again with the Second Doctor's help. Following this, Lethbridge-Stewart became convinced of the necessity of scientific advice in battling extraterrestrial threats, and recruited Dr Elizabeth Shaw from Cambridge. Coincidentally, the recently regenerated Third Doctor had been exiled to Earth by the Time Lords, and he agreed to join UNIT as its Scientific Advisor just in time to help defeat the Autons (Spearhead from Space).  The Doctor was later assisted by Jo Grant.

In addition to combatting alien threats, the British contingent has also been responsible for providing general security under the aegis of the UN. A significant example was the provision of security at the Styles peace conference.

UNIT first operated out of an office building in London and subsequently moved to a headquarters in the country that had been built over the ruins of a priory (Pyramids of Mars). Its main headquarters, mentioned but never seen in the television series, is with the United Nations in Geneva.

When the Third Doctor's exile was lifted, his association with UNIT became more sporadic, especially after his regeneration into his fourth incarnation. The last appearance of UNIT in the series for many years was in The Seeds of Doom (1976); however, the organisation continued to execute its mandate to investigate and combat alien activity.

Lethbridge-Stewart retired in 1976 (Mawdryn Undead, 1983), and was succeeded by Colonel Crichton (The Five Doctors). UNIT did not appear again in force until the Seventh Doctor serial, Battlefield (1989), where the British contingent (although it also has foreign members) was commanded by Brigadier Winifred Bambera, and Lethbridge-Stewart was called out of retirement to help defeat an other-dimensional invasion of armoured knights led by Morgaine.

Twenty-first century
UNIT was referenced by acronym and full name in the 2005 series episodes "Aliens of London" and "World War Three", where it sent a delegation to a gathering of experts at 10 Downing Street in response to a spaceship crashing in the River Thames. All of the experts were electrocuted by the alien Slitheen. None of the members of UNIT seen were from the original series, although one of them was originally said to be Doctor Who Magazine comic strip character Muriel Frost. They would appear again in "The Christmas Invasion"', with a facility in the Tower of London, access to alien language translation software, and awareness of Martians. Prime Minister Harriet Jones oversaw the Sycorax crisis from this facility alongside commanding officer Major Blake.

The UK contingent of UNIT has ties to Torchwood, while the United Nations are unaware of its existence; this may indicate that the UK contingent of UNIT keeps secrets from its parent organisation. Major Blake contacted Torchwood to assist against the Sycorax in "The Christmas Invasion"; in Torchwood episode "Greeks Bearing Gifts", Jack Harkness mentions putting together some documents for UNIT; in "End of Days", UNIT is one of the groups that have contacted Harkness about the events of that episode. There is rivalry between the two groups however; in "Reset", Jack derisively refers to UNIT in this episode as "the acceptable face of intelligence gathering about aliens", and Torchwood did not inform UNIT about the powerful Resurrection Gauntlet.

"Turn Left" revealed that UNIT was involved in investigating the attempted Racnoss invasion, independently of the Doctor.  In the alternative universe created in that episode by the Tenth Doctor's death, one UNIT team discovered the Doctor's body, whilst another under Captain Erisa Magambo and Rose Tyler salvaged "surface technology" from the Doctor's dying TARDIS in order to send Donna Noble back in time and prevent the Doctor's death.

In "The Sound of Drums", UNIT is shown to have an aircraft carrier called the Valiant designed by Minister of Defence and later Prime Minister Harold "Harry" Saxon (alias the Master). UNIT assumes control of handling the Toclafane visitation, not knowing it has been secretly engineered by the Master. While brief radio reports can be heard near the end suggesting UNIT is being overwhelmed by the Toclafane invasion, the Paradox machine's destruction reverses time to just before the invasion began.

In The Sarah Jane Adventures serial Revenge of the Slitheen, Sarah Jane Smith telephones UNIT to tell them about the secret rooms around the world with alien machinery inside, located in schools constructed by the fictional Coldfire Construction. UNIT is also referred to in the serial The Lost Boy, where UNIT used its political clout to pull strings with the London police to have its former quasi-member Sarah Jane Smith (Sarah was never an official employee of UNIT in the way that her two predecessors were) released without charge after she was arrested for alleged child abduction.

In the Torchwood episode "Reset" it is established that the Doctor's former companion Martha Jones has joined UNIT as a qualified doctor (the Doctor having recommended her to UNIT) and when Jack Harkness was in need of some help he drafted her into the Torchwood Institute on a temporary basis. UNIT were working on the same mystery as the Torchwood Institute in that episode and the two organisations pooled their resources in order to solve it.

UNIT's first proper team-up with the Doctor in the new series occurred in the 2008 2-parter "The Sontaran Stratagem/The Poison Sky". They are now a larger, better-outfitted organisation, getting a large amount of legal powers (and of funding from the United Nations) — including the capability to command & co-ordinate the planet's nuclear weaponry in a single strike — in the name of "Homeworld Security". The UK branch is under the command of Colonel Mace. Under the codename Operation Blue Sky, UNIT (via Martha Jones) called in the Doctor and seized control of the central factory for ATMOS Systems, intending to investigate whether it was an alien front organisation. In the process, two soldiers were brainwashed by the Sontarans and Martha Jones replaced by a clone, while the Sontaran Tenth Battle Fleet (reacting to the Doctor's presence) advanced their invasion plans, attempting to change the atmosphere and disabling UNIT's nuclear strikes. Despite an initial massacre at the ATMOS factory, a change in weaponry and tactical use of the Valiant meant that UNIT retook the factory and defeated the Sontaran attack force there, giving the Doctor the opening to stop the Sontaran stratagem.

"The Stolen Earth"/"Journey's End" two-part episode showed that a major UNIT base in Manhattan had managed to create a rudimentary teleport device based on salvaged Sontaran technology, known as Project Indigo; Martha Jones had been promoted to Indigo's chief medical officer. UNIT had also created the Osterhagen Key, a doomsday weapon that would trigger over twenty-four nuclear warheads under the Earth's crust and destroy the planet in the event of a situation that left humanity in incredible suffering with no hope of survival. When the Earth was shifted to the Medusa Cascade by Davros and the Daleks, the Daleks attacked UNIT bases, destroying the Valiant and wiping out the Manhattan base. While the UN surrendered, Martha was ordered to use Project Indigo prototype to escape, and to attempt to find the Doctor and (if no other option remained) to use the Osterhagen Key. With her help, the Daleks were defeated and Earth returned to its proper place, and The Doctor asked that she destroy the Osterhagen Key.

In the Sarah Jane Adventures serial The Mark of the Berserker, Alan Jackson hacks into the UNIT database to find information on the alien Berserker. He is also able to use a UNIT tracking system to locate Clyde Langer via his mobile phone.

In the Sarah Jane Adventures story Enemy of the Bane, Brigadier Sir Alistair Gordon Lethbridge-Stewart is seen in the company of a Major Cal Kilburne, who is attempting to debrief him on his 'recent mission in Peru' (in "The Sontaran Stratagem"/"The Poison Sky" it was mentioned that 'Sir Alistair' was in Peru). Lethbridge-Stewart is apparently 'retired', but he still serves as UNIT's 'Special Envoy'. He later aids Sarah-Jane and Rani in breaking into UNIT's 'Black Archive' Facility, which is a repository of all extraterrestrial knowledge and artefacts that UNIT have amassed. The Brigadier questions the ethics of the modern UNIT's revised and more aggressive approach to dealing with alien threats, and Sarah Jane is concerned that UNIT would treat her son Luke as a test subject with no regard for his human rights should they discover him.

UNIT returned in the 2009 Easter special "Planet of the Dead" investigating the disappearance of the 200 bus. Captain Erisa Magambo makes a reappearance from her last in "Turn Left" as the commander of UNIT, aided by the new scientific adviser Malcolm Taylor. They appeared again during The Sarah Jane Adventures serial Death of the Doctor which introduced a UNIT Base at Mount Snowdon.

In 2012, after a 3-year absence, UNIT returned in the episode "The Power of Three" when millions of black cubes appear around the globe. The UNIT force is headed by scientific adviser Kate Stewart, the daughter of the late Brigadier Lethbridge-Stewart. The Doctor and Amy Pond are summoned to the Tower of London - where UNIT still have their headquarters - and are investigating various cubes and observing what they do. In this story, UNIT have a very different uniform to that last seen in "Planet of the Dead". There is no mention or references to any previous characters other than the Brigadier.

UNIT return in "The Day of the Doctor" in 2013. The Doctor and Clara are unexpectedly airlifted in the TARDIS to Trafalgar Square where they meet up with Kate Stewart and her new assistant Osgood. Kate gives the Doctor preserved instructions from his previous wife Elizabeth I of England that name him curator of Undergallery, a secret vault of forbidden art housed at the National Gallery. Kate and Osgood accompany the Doctor and Clara to this vault where they come across proof of the veracity of Elizabeth's message, a three-dimensional painting made with Time Lord stasis cubes. The painting depicts the fall of Gallifrey's second city, Arcadia, on the last day of the Time War. Once in the Undergallery, Kate shows the Doctor other paintings that have been broken from within. While examining the paintings, a fissure in time opens above them and the Doctor jumps into it. Osgood and McGillop stay in the National Gallery to investigate some missing statues whilst Kate and Clara travel to the Tower of London to UNIT's TARDIS-proofed Black Archive. Osgood and McGillop are captured and stored by the Zygons who subsequently take their appearance and follow Kate to the Black Archive, who is also revealed to be a Zygon. The real characters, along with the Zygons, end up together in the Black Archive and a countdown that will detonate a nuclear warhead underneath them begins. The Doctor(s) arrive and use the archive's mind-wiping equipment to render the UNIT members and Zygons temporarily unaware which of them are which so nothing is destroyed. What happens after this is as yet unclear.

UNIT, including Kate Stewart and Osgood, return in "Death in Heaven", the series 8 finale. Kate and UNIT reappeared in "The Magician's Apprentice" then appear along with Osgood yet again in the two part episode "The Zygon Invasion" and "The Zygon Inversion". Osgood is mentioned by when the Doctor contacts UNIT as they appeared in the ending in "The Return of Doctor Mysterio".

In the 2019 New Year special "Resolution", the Thirteenth Doctor attempts to call on Kate Stewart for assistance, but discovers UNIT operations have been suspended and replaced with an outsourced call centre, due to a diplomatic argument over funding.

In the 2020 New Year's Day episode, "Spyfall, Part 1", it is stated that UNIT and Torchwood no longer exist.

In other media
As well as various novels and audios depicting other events during the Doctor's exile in his third incarnation, UNIT have appeared with other Doctors in other novels. Deep Blue features the Fifth Doctor interacting with the UNIT of the Third Doctor's era, arriving in their time to assist in a crisis while his past self is travelling in the TARDIS.

The novel The Shadows of Avalon, set in 2012, sees the Eighth Doctor resign from UNIT to act as a magical advisor in a dimension linked to humanity's subconscious that has become accessible via a rift in Britain.

The organization's future is glimpsed in other novels. Alien Bodies reveals that UNIT had evolved into UNISYC- the United Nations Security Yard Corps- by the 2050s, with members suffering from far more psychological problems than UNIT soldiers presented in the show. In Cold Fusion, by the twenty-fifth century, UNIT has 'evolved' into Unitas, an all-male organization dedicated to protecting Earth from any perceived alien threat, to the extent that they attempt to pre-emptively prevent a perceived Time Lord invasion of Earth's Empire that nearly destroys history. According to the Seventh Doctor's companion Roz Forrester, by the thirtieth century the organisation now merely arranges bake sales and argues about whether or not Lethbridge-Stewart was hyphenated.

References

External links

 "Official" UNIT website (BBC-sponsored) [Password="badwolf"]
  - fan-written website

UNIT
Fictional intelligence agencies